Jasdan is one of the 182 Legislative Assembly constituencies of Gujarat state in India. It is part of Rajkot district.

List of segments
This assembly seat represents the following segments,
 Jasdan Taluka

 Gondal Taluka (Part) Villages – Dadva Hamirpara, Karmal Kotda.
Sayla Taluka (Part) of Surendranagar District Village – Ori.

Members of Legislative Assembly
2002 - Kunvarjibhai Bavaliya, Indian National Congress
2007 - Kunvarjibhai Bavaliya, Indian National Congress
2009 - Bharat Boghara Bhartiya Janta Party (By Poll)
2012 - Bholabhai Gohel, Indian National Congress

Election results

2022

2017

2012

See also
 List of constituencies of Gujarat Legislative Assembly
 Gujarat Legislative Assembly
 Rajkot district

References

External links
 

Assembly constituencies of Gujarat
Rajkot district